Všeň is a municipality and village in Semily District in the Liberec Region of the Czech Republic. It has about 600 inhabitants.

Administrative parts
Villages of Mokrý and Ploukonice are administrative parts of Všeň.

Twin towns – sister cities

Všeň is twinned with:
 Ledro, Italy

References

Villages in Semily District